Fabrice Amedeo is a French sailor born on 24 February 1978 in Château-Gontier in the Mayenne region. He is an offshore professional sailor having competed in the Vendée Globe, finishing 11th in 2016. He also competed in 2020 edition where he retired due to various technical problem with the onboard electronics. He is also a well-known political journalist for Le Figaro.

References

External links

 Official Website

1978 births
Living people
People from Château-Gontier
French male sailors (sport)
French Vendee Globe sailors
2016 Vendee Globe sailors
2020 Vendee Globe sailors
Vendée Globe finishers
Single-handed circumnavigating sailors
Sportspeople from Mayenne